Jules Merviel (Saint-Beauzély, 29 September 1906 — Toulon, 1 September 1976) was a French professional road bicycle racer. Merviel won a stage in the 1930 Tour de France. In the 1935 Tour de France, he hit the back of a truck and did not race for two years.

Major results

1929
Paris-Caen
Dreyron
1930
Tour de France:
Winner stage 7
Yverdon
1931
Yverdon
1933
Paris–Tours
24 hours of Montpellier (with Gabriel Marcillac)
1934
Paris-Nevers
Touquet

His name, suitedly, comes from the French word "mervielleux", it means extraordinary or supernatural.

External links 

Official Tour de France results for Jules Merviel

French male cyclists
1906 births
1976 deaths
French Tour de France stage winners
Sportspeople from Aveyron
Cyclists from Occitania (administrative region)